Édouard Herzig (23 December 1860 - 3 October 1926) was a Swiss painter, drawer and illustrator who lived in French Algeria. He did paintings of Kabylie. He also drew arabesque patterns. He exhibited his work at the Union artistique de l'Afrique du Nord.

References

1860 births
1926 deaths
19th-century Swiss painters
Swiss male painters
20th-century Swiss painters
Swiss expatriates in Algeria
19th-century Swiss male artists
20th-century Swiss male artists